Alia Mohammed Ali Aldahlawi has been a Member of the Consultative Assembly of Saudi Arabia since December 2016.

She holds a bachelor's and master's degree in microbiology from King Abdulaziz University, and completed her PhD at King's College London in 2005, entitled "Interaction of legionnaire's disease bacterium with human dendritic cells".

References

Year of birth missing (living people)
Living people
King Abdulaziz University alumni
Alumni of King's College London
Members of the Consultative Assembly of Saudi Arabia
Academic staff of King Abdulaziz University